Joo Hyun (born Joo Il-choon, ; March 1, 1943) is a South Korean actor.

Biography 
Joo graduated from Konkuk University in Seoul, where he majored in political science and diplomacy. He began his acting career after being selected through a special recruiting program by the Korean Broadcasting System (KBS) in 1969, making his debut the following year in Vietnam War Battlefield. In 1990 Joo played his first comedic role, giving a memorable performance in the KBS TV drama Seoul Ttukbaeki.

Joo starred in the 2004 film A Family alongside Soo Ae, portraying a single father who has a troubled relationship with his daughter. His performance found favour with critics, with Darcy Paquet of Koreanfilm.org saying, "in his accomplished handling of small details and the film's quieter moments, Joo succeeds in making the father a real person instead of a stereotype", and in October 2005 won the award for Best Actor at the 50th Asia Pacific Film Festival.

In 2006 Joo starred in the musical comedy film The Fox Family, learning to sing and dance during a month-long period of intensive training. He chose the film because the story was fun and unconventional, and said, "it was fun to challenge myself and I don't have any regrets".

Joo is the father of two children, having both a son and a daughter.

Filmography

Film

Television series

Television shows

References

External links 

South Korean male television actors
South Korean male film actors
Konkuk University alumni
People from North Hamgyong
1943 births
Living people